Heart of Darkness is a 1993 television adaptation of Joseph Conrad’s famous 1899 novella written by Benedict Fitzgerald, directed by Nicolas Roeg, and starring Tim Roth, John Malkovich, Isaach De Bankolé and James Fox. The show is the third screen adaptation of the novella, following a 1958 television adaptation for the anthology series Playhouse 90 starring Boris Karloff, and 1979's Apocalypse Now with Marlon Brando, which loosely adapted it and updated it to the Vietnam War.

The film was filmed as a co-production with Ted Turner's Turner Pictures, and then aired by his TNT network.

Plot
Ivory trader Captain Charles Marlow (Roth) is sent up the Congo River to retrieve cargo, and along the way, learns of the successful and enigmatic trader Kurtz (Malkovich), who is worshiped as a god by the natives.

Cast
 Tim Roth – Marlow
 John Malkovich – Mr. Kurtz
 Isaach De Bankolé – Mfumu
 James Fox – Gosse
 Phoebe Nicholls – The Intended
 Morten Faldaas – Harlequin
 Alan Corduner – Verne
 Patrick Ryecart – De Griffe
 Michael Fitzgerald – Harou
 Geoffrey Hutchings – Delcommune
 Iman – Black Beauty
 Ian McDiarmid – Doctor
 Peter Vaughan – Director
 John Savident – Company Director

Awards
The series won and was nominated for several awards, including:
 Primetime Emmy for Sound Editing – 1994 (Won)
 CableABC Award for Art Direction – 1995 (Won)
 CableABC Award for Costume Design – 1995 (Nominated)
Furthermore, Malkovich was nominated for both a Screen Actors Guild Award and a Golden Globe for Best Actor in 1995.

References

External links
 
 Heart of Darkness at Rotten Tomatoes
 

1993 films
Films based on works by Joseph Conrad
Films set in the 1890s
Films set in Belgian Congo
Films scored by Stanley Myers
Television shows based on works by Joseph Conrad
Works based on Heart of Darkness